The Revenue Act of 1936,  (June 22, 1936), established an "undistributed profits tax" on corporations in the United States .

It was signed into law by President Franklin D. Roosevelt.

The act was applicable to incomes for 1936 and thereafter. Roosevelt sought additional permanent revenue of $620,000,000 and temporary revenue of $517,000,000. To secure the permanent revenue he suggested the substitution of a tax on undistributed earnings of corporations. Individual rates were raised only on the very rich (that is, income over $5 million a year.).

See also
 
 Revenue Act of 1935, which raised taxes on high incomes

Tax on corporations

Normal tax 

A Normal Tax was levied on the net income of corporations as shown in the following table.

Surtax on undistributed profits 

A Surtax was levied on corporations on "undistributed profits", i.e. profits not paid out in dividends, as shown in the following table.

Tax on individuals 

A normal tax and a surtax were levied against the net income of individuals as shown in the following table.

Exemption of $1,000 for single filers and $2,500 for married couples and heads of family. A $400 exemption for each dependent under 18.

See also
 Revenue Act of 1935, which raised taxes on high incomes

References

Further reading
 Paul, Randolph E. "The Background of the Revenue Act of 1937." U. Chicago Law Review .  5 (1937): 41+ online

United States federal taxation legislation
1936 in law